Pellissippi (Pelisipi, Pelisippi) may refer to:

 Clinch River, formerly known as the Pellissippi River
 Ohio River, formerly known as the Pellissippi River
 Pellissippi Lodge, of the Order of the Arrow boyscouts
 Pellissippi Parkway, a highway in Tennessee
 Pellissippi State Community College, in Knox County, Tennessee